Hao Xiaojiang (born 10 July 1951) is a Chinese scientist currently working as a researcher, doctoral supervisor at the Kunming Institute of Botany.

Biography
Hao was born in Chongqing on July 10, 1951. During the Cultural Revolution in December 1968, he became a sent-down youth in Qianxinan Buyei and Miao Autonomous Prefecture. In August 1971 he was transferred to a nitrogenous fertilizer plant as a worker. In 1973 he was accepted to Guizhou University, where he graduated in 1976. In 1985 he obtained his Master of Science degree from Kunming Institute of Botany, the Chinese Academy of Sciences (CAS). He earned his Doctor of Pharmacy degree from Kyoto University in 1990.

He was chairman of Kunming Institute of Botany from November 1997 to November 2001.

Honours and awards
 1995 National Science Fund for Distinguished Young Scholars
 2017 Regional Innovation Award of the Ho Leung Ho Lee Foundation
 November 22, 2019 Member of the Chinese Academy of Sciences (CAS)

References

External links
Hao Xiaojiang  on the Chinese Academy of Sciences (CAS) 

1951 births
Scientists from Chongqing
Living people
Guizhou University alumni
Kyoto University alumni
Members of the Chinese Academy of Sciences